The IBM ThinkPad 600 series are a series of notebook computers introduced in 1998 by IBM as the immediate predecessor to the T-series which still exists today under Lenovo ownership. Three models were produced, the 600, 600E, and 600X; the series was succeeded in 2000 by the ThinkPad T20 series.

Features
The 600 series was designed to be a more portable version of the 770 series, featuring slimmer dimensions and a weight of around 5 pounds (2.3 kg), by using lightweight but strong carbon fiber composite plastics. The 600 series also introduced the new UltraSlimBay (not to be confused with the UltraBay Slim as found on the later T40/T60 series), as well as easily interchangeable RAM and hard drives; all 600 series machines shipped with 32 or 64 MB of RAM integrated on the motherboard from the factory.

The 600 series originally shipped with either Windows 95 or Windows NT 4.0, with later models shipping with Windows 98 or Windows 2000; all 600 models could also run Windows 3.x, OS/2 Warp 4, Windows Me, or Windows XP as well as various Linux distributions. None of the 600 series models included wireless adapters or Ethernet ports as an option, but these could be added through a third-party PCMCIA/CardBus card.

One common problem of the 600 series was a battery defect, where the battery would discharge rapidly or otherwise have a poor battery life; use of a third-party battery as well as a BIOS update can help alleviate this problem.

Models
ThinkPad 600 - First model shipped, featured either a Pentium MMX at 233 MHz or a Pentium II at 233, 266 or 300 MHz. This model had the option of either a 12.1" SVGA TFT display, a 13.0" XGA HPA display, or a 13.3" XGA TFT display, and shipped with an external floppy drive, a built-in CD-ROM drive, and a choice of a 3.2 GB, 4.0 GB, or a 5.1 GB hard drive. The 600 also had infrared, USB 1.0, and a modem as standard features, and shipped with either 32 MB or 64 MB of RAM (upgradeable to 288 MB/320 MB using PC66 SODIMMs)
ThinkPad 600E - Featuring a Pentium II processor at either 300 MHz, 366 MHz, or 400 MHz, all models of the 600E featured at 13.3" XGA TFT display as standard. This model shipped with an external floppy drive, built-in CD-ROM,  either a 4.0 GB, 6.4 GB or 10 GB hard drive, and 32 MB or 64 MB of RAM on the motherboard (upgradeable to 288 MB/320 MB/512 MB using PC66 SODIMMs). The 600E also was the first of the 600 series to offer a DVD-ROM drive as an option, as well as a TV output port (using a special dongle that was supplied to provide composite and S-Video ports).
ThinkPad 600X - The final model of the 600 series, featuring a Pentium III at either 450 MHz, 500 MHz, or 650 MHz (with SpeedStep technology) and a 13.3" XGA TFT display as standard. This model shipped with a 6 GB or 12 GB hard drive, a Mini-PCI Modem, either a CD-ROM or DVD-ROM drive, and 64 MB of RAM on the motherboard (upgradeable to 512 MB using PC100 SODIMMs).

Comparison

References

ThinkPad 600
600